Several years after the Portuguese first explored Brazil, French traders in search of pau-brasil (a type of brazilwood) reached the rich area extending from the Cape Frio coast to the beaches and islands of Guanabara Bay, the economic and, above all, strategic importance of which was already well-known.

Overview

In 1555, one of the islands of Guanabara Bay, now called Villegagnon Island, was occupied by 500 French colonists under admiral Nicolas Durand de Villegaignon. Consequently, Villegagnon built Fort Coligny on the island when attempting to establish the France Antarctique colony, which the French called Henriville in honor of Henry II of France.

See also
 Timeline of Rio de Janeiro history
 History of the city of São Paulo

References

Further reading

Edmund Roberts ''Embassy to the Eastern Courts of Cochin-China, Siam, and Muscat''. New York: Harper & Brothers (1837). Chapter One.

External links
 History of Rio de Janeiro